The Government College Women University Sialkot (GCWUS) is a public university located in Sialkot, Punjab, Pakistan.

Recognized university
This university is recognized by the Higher Education Commission of Pakistan.

History
Government College for Women was inaugurated by the respectable Mohtarma Fatima Jinnah (Mather-e-Millat) on 1 December 1951 and its first principal was Muneem-ud-Din. Next to Miss Muneem-ud-Din, Miss Kazmi a well known educationist became the second principal of the institution.Under Miss Kazmi the institution flourished to its full. The college was initiated with only 32 students and 10 teaching staff members. It multiplied to almost 4500 students and the teaching staff working at present is 71 out of 108 and the Non-Teaching staff is 61. The F.A. classes started in 1951, F.Sc. classes in 1952 and B.Sc. in 1960. The college was upgraded into a Post Graduated College in 1989 offering master's degree 
classes in the subject of English, Urdu and Islamiyat. BS Hons. 4 Years Degree Program was introduced by the Higher Education Department in 2010. Keeping in view its educational growth rate, it attained the status of first Women University in Sialkot in 2012 and was renamed as the Government College Women University, Sialkot.

Programs
The university offers undergraduate and postgraduate programs in the following disciplines:

Science and technology
 Information Technology
 Zoology
 Botany
 Chemistry
 Physics
 Computer Science
 Political Science
 Biology

Arts and humanities
 English 
 Urdu
 Economics
 Mathematics

Business and social sciences
 Business Administration
 Statistics
 Applied Psychology
 Fine arts
 Islamic learning
 International Relations

See also
 University of Sahiwal
 Government College Women University, Faisalabad
 University of Okara
 Government Sadiq College Women University, Bahawalpur
 Women University Multan

References

External links 
 GCWUS official website

Public universities and colleges in Punjab, Pakistan
Universities and colleges in Sialkot
Educational institutions established in 1951
1951 establishments in Pakistan
Women's universities and colleges in Pakistan